Dougouolo is a small town and commune in the Cercle of Bla in the Ségou Region of southern-central Mali. As of 1998 the commune had a population of 7,120.

References

Communes of Ségou Region